The men's pole vault event at the 2022 African Championships in Athletics was held on 11 June in Port Louis, Mauritius.

Results

References

2022 African Championships in Athletics
Pole vault at the African Championships in Athletics